Rasul Gamzatovich Gamzatov (8 September 19233 November 2003) was a popular Russian poet who wrote in Avar language. Among his poems was Zhuravli, which became a well-known Soviet song.

Life
Gamzatov was born on 8 September 1923 in the Avar village of Tsada in the north-east Caucasus. His father, Gamzat Tsadasa, was a well-known bard, heir to the ancient tradition of minstrelsy still thriving in the mountains. He was eleven when he wrote his first verse about a group of local boys who ran down to the clearing where an airplane had landed for the first time. A number of different poems by him also became songs, such as Gone Sunny Days. 

In 1939 he graduated from Pedagogical College. He had various jobs serving as a school teacher, an assistant director in the theater, a journalist in newspapers and a radio host. From 1945 to 1950 he studied at the Maxim Gorky Literature Institute.

Gamzatov was awarded the State Stalin Prize in 1952, The Lenin Prize in 1963, and Laureate Of The International Botev Prize in 1981.

Gamzatov died on November 3, 2003 at the age of 80 in the Moscow Central Clinical Hospital.  He was buried in the old Muslim cemetery in Tarki, next to the grave of his wife.

A monument to Gamzatov was unveiled on 5 July 2013 on Yauzsky Boulevard in central Moscow.

Honours and awards

 Hero of Socialist Labour (27 September 1974)
 Order of St. Andrew (8 September 2003) - for outstanding contribution to the development of national literature and public activities
 Order of Merit for the Fatherland, 3rd class (18 April 1999) - for outstanding contribution to the multinational culture of Russia
 Order of the Friendship of Peoples (6 September 1993) - for outstanding contribution to the development of the multinational Soviet literature and productive social activities
 Four Orders of Lenin
 Order of the October Revolution
 Order of the Red Banner of Labour, four times
 Order of Peter the Great
 Order of Saints Cyril and Methodius (Bulgaria)
 Lenin Prize (1963) - for the book "High Star"
 Stalin Prize, third class (1952) - a collection of poems and the poems "The year of my birth"
 State Prize of the RSFSR, Gorky (1980) - for the poem "Take care of mothers'
 People's Poet of Daghestan
 International Award for "Best Poet of the 20th century"
 Writers Award in Asia and Africa "Lotus"
 Jawaharlal Nehru Award
 Ferdowsi Award
 Award of Hristo Botev
 International Prize Sholokhov in art and literature
 Award Lermontov
 Award Fadeeva
 Award Batyr
 Award Mahmoud
 C. Award Stalskiy
 G. Award Tsadasy
 Order of the Golden Fleece (Georgia)

References

External links
http://www.gamzatov.ru - Official site, coordinated by Ministry of national politics, information and foreign affairs of Dagestan (in Russian and in English).
Gamzatov poetry
http://gazeta.ru/2003/11/03/umerrasulgam.shtml - Necrology at http://gazeta.ru (in Russian)
https://web.archive.org/web/20040707115614/http://www.dagpravda.ru/ob/rasul01-11-03.htm - Obituary in "Dagestanskaja Pravda" (in Russian)

1923 births
2003 deaths
People from Khunzakhsky District
Avar people
Communist Party of the Soviet Union members
Sixth convocation members of the Soviet of the Union
Seventh convocation members of the Soviet of the Union
Eighth convocation members of the Soviet of the Union
Ninth convocation members of the Soviet of the Union
Tenth convocation members of the Soviet of the Union
Eleventh convocation members of the Soviet of the Union
Soviet poets
Soviet male writers
20th-century Russian male writers
Russian male poets
Poets from Dagestan
Heroes of Socialist Labour
Stalin Prize winners
Recipients of the Order "For Merit to the Fatherland", 3rd class
Recipients of the Order of Friendship of Peoples
Recipients of the Order of Lenin
Recipients of the Order of the Golden Fleece (Georgia)
Recipients of the Order of the Red Banner of Labour
Lenin Prize winners
Maxim Gorky Literature Institute alumni